Glossinavirus is a genus of viruses, in the family Hytrosaviridae. Glossina sp serve as natural hosts. There is only one species in this genus: Glossina hytrosavirus. Diseases associated with this genus include: partial sterility due to ovarian abnormalities or to testicular degeneration; can be asymptomatic in laboratory colonies.

Structure
Viruses in the genus Glossinavirus are enveloped, with rod-shaped geometries. The diameter is around 50 nm. Genomes are circular, around 190kb in length. The genome has 160 open reading frames.

Life cycle
Viral replication is nuclear. DNA-templated transcription is the method of transcription. Glossina species serve as the natural host. Transmission routes are parental.

References

External links
 ICTV Report: Hytrosaviridae
 Viralzone: Glossinavirus

Hytrosaviridae
Virus genera